Ernest John Yard (3 May 1941 – 23 November 2004) was a Scottish professional footballer, who played as a forward or winger. He could also play as a full back.

Playing career
Yard was born in Stranraer, Scotland and began his youth career at hometown club Stranraer going on to a senior career at the club. He later played for Kilmarnock, Partick Thistle, Bury, Crystal Palace and Reading before moving to South Africa where he played for Cape Town City. Yard made a total of 260 appearances in the Scottish League and the English Football League and scored 53 goals.

Ernie Yard died in November 2004, aged 63.

References

External links
 
 Stats at killiefc.com
 Ernie Yard at holmesdale.net
 

1941 births
2004 deaths
People from Stranraer
Scottish footballers
Association football forwards
Stranraer F.C. players
Kilmarnock F.C. players
Partick Thistle F.C. players
Bury F.C. players
Crystal Palace F.C. players
Reading F.C. players
Cape Town City F.C. (NFL) players
English Football League players
Scottish Football League players
Expatriate soccer players in South Africa
Date of death missing
Scottish expatriate footballers
Scottish expatriate sportspeople in South Africa
National Football League (South Africa) players